John Robinson (May 8, 1838 – April 28, 1917) was a farmer, businessman, and politician from Vermont.  A Democrat, he served as Sheriff of Bennington County and United States Marshal for the District of Vermont.

Early life
John Robinson was born in County Meath, Ireland on May 8, 1838, a son of Thomas Robinson and Mary (Flood) Robinson.  His family immigrated to the United States in 1839, and Robinson was raised and educated in Shaftsbury and Bennington.  Robinson became a farmer, worked as a foreman for the Henry Burden & Sons iron ore mines, and settled in Bennington.

Business career
Over time, Robinson's farm grew to over 400 acres, and he raised sheep, cattle, and horses.  In addition to farming, Robinson was an auctioneer and wool broker.  He also speculated in real estate and served on the Savings Bank of Bennington's board of trustees.  In addition, Robinson was a member of several fraternal organizations, including the Elks and the Improved Order of Red Men.

Political career
A Democrat during an era when Vermont's politics were dominated by Republicans, Robinson served in several elective offices despite his party affiliation, including town selectman and justice of the peace.  He was Bennington's first constable and tax collector from 1872 to 1885, and a deputy sheriff of Bennington County from 1878 to 1882.  From 1882 to 1884, Robinson served as Bennington County Sheriff.

Democrat Grover Cleveland assumed the presidency in 1885, and in 1886 he appointed Robinson US Marshal for the District of Vermont.  Cleveland lost his 1888 bid for reelection and Republican Benjamin Harrison became president in 1889.  In 1890, Harrison appointed Rollin Amsden to succeed Robinson as marshal.  Later that year, Robinson was again elected sheriff, and he served until 1892.

Cleveland returned to the presidency in 1893, and in 1894 he appointed Robinson to serve as Bennington's postmaster.  Republican William McKinley became president in 1897, and appointed Arthur J. Dewey to succeed Robinson.

Later life
Robinson maintained his interest in politics, including accepting Democratic nominations for various offices.  In 1904 and 1905, he was an unsuccessful candidate for town trustee of public money.  In 1905 he was also an unsuccessful candidate for school board member.  In March 1910, he was an unsuccessful candidate for town selectman.  In September 1910, he was an unsuccessful candidate for assistant judge.  In 1913, he was again an unsuccessful candidate for town trustee of public money.

Death and burial
Robinson died at his home in Bennington on April 28, 1917.  He was buried at Park Lawn Cemetery in Bennington.  The cemetery was created on land that Robinson had once owned and he was the first president of the corporation formed to found and operate it.

Family
In 1864, Robinson married Margaret Erwin (d. 1923).  They were the parents of an adopted daughter, Elizabeth (1877–1964).

References

Sources

Newspapers

Internet

Books

1838 births
1917 deaths
People from County Meath
People from Bennington, Vermont
Vermont Democrats
Vermont sheriffs
United States Marshals
Vermont postmasters
Burials in Vermont
19th-century American politicians
Irish emigrants to the United States (before 1923)